Vegimal or Vegimals may refer to:

 Part-animal, part-vegetable creatures on the children's book and television series The Octonauts. 

 A plush toy brand of the defunct Freemountain Toys of Vermont, US